Loren Warren "L.W." Collins (August 7, 1838 – September 27, 1912) was an American jurist and politician.

Early life and education 
Born in Lowell, Massachusetts, Collins moved with his family to Eden Prairie, Minnesota Territory, in 1853. He studied law in Hastings, Minnesota.

Career 
Collins served in the 7th Minnesota Infantry Regiment during the American Civil War and practiced law in St. Cloud, Minnesota. He served as mayor of St. Cloud and as county attorney for Stearns County, Minnesota. Collins served in the Minnesota House of Representatives from 1881 to 1885. He then served as a Minnesota District Court judge from 1885 to 1887. Collins served on the Minnesota Supreme Court from 1887 until his resignation in 1904. Collins was an unsuccessful candidate in the 1904 Minnesota gubernatorial election.

Personal life 
Collins died at his home in Minneapolis, Minnesota.

References

1838 births
1912 deaths
Politicians from Lowell, Massachusetts
Politicians from St. Cloud, Minnesota
People of Minnesota in the American Civil War
Mayors of places in Minnesota
Minnesota state court judges
Justices of the Minnesota Supreme Court
Members of the Minnesota House of Representatives
19th-century American judges